The Frederick Marathon was the flagship race of several races held in Frederick, Maryland known collectively as the Frederick Running Festival. The 7th annual marathon took place on May 2, 2010, and 706 participants finished. Carefirst (the mid-atlantic organization of the Blue Cross and Blue Shield Association), sponsored the event.

In the 2010 race, Morton Caster of Westminster, Maryland won the men's race with a time of 2:44:57, while Becki Pierotti of Hazleton, Pennsylvania won the woman's race with a time of 3:14:49.

A notable result in the marathon's history is Michael Wardian's breaking the then world record for fastest marathon while pushing a baby stroller.  Wardian accomplished this in 2007 with a time of 2:42:21.   Wardian also owns the men's record for the race, with a 2:26:44 finish in 2006.

Other races that take place are a half-marathon, team relay race, 5K run, and kids fun run.

It was announced in October 2010 that the marathon was discontinued.  The safety of marathon runners was cited as a primary factor.  The Running Festival will continue, with a focus on the half marathon.

Winners

Men
2010 Morton Caster, 2:44:56
2009 Dickson Mercer, 2:37:03
2008 Brian Baillie, 2:34:49 
2007 Christopher Zieman, 2:27:15
2006 Michael Wardian, 2:26:44 (Record)
2005 Michael Wardian, 2:29:13
2004 Jaime Dick, 2:50:08 
2003 Maurits Van Der Veen, 2:37:11

Women
2010 Becki Pierotti, 3:14:49
2009 Denise Knickman, 3:02:20
2008 Melissa Tanner, 2:56:17
2007 Jenn Shelton, 2:53:44 (Record)
2006 Kristin Van Eron, 2:57:19 
2005 Susan Graham-Gray, 2:56:58
2004 Susan Graham-Gray, 3:05:50
2003 Becki McClintock, 3:28:25

Notes and references

External links
Frederick Marathon official website

Marathons in the United States
Sports in Frederick, Maryland
Road running competitions in the United States